Eastpointe (formerly East Detroit) is a city on the southern edge of Macomb County, Michigan, United States.  As of the 2010 census, the city population was 32,442. Eastpointe forms a part of the Metro Detroit area. It borders 8 Mile Road on the northern edge of Detroit.

History
The community was first settled by Irish and German immigrants in the 1830s. In October 1897, a Post Office was established there with the name of "Half-way", as it was near the halfway point of the stage run between downtown Detroit and the Macomb County seat at Mount Clemens.  It incorporated as the village of Halfway in December 1924 and reincorporated as the City of East Detroit in January 1929. Prior to 1924, most of the community formed a part of Erin Township.  The city changed its name to "Eastpointe" after the change was approved by residents in a 1992 referendum; the name change had been proposed to remove any perceived association with the adjacent city of Detroit; the "pointe" suffix is intended to associate the city instead with the nearby affluent communities of the Grosse Pointes.

The city's school district was unaffected by the municipal name change, and was called East Detroit Public Schools until 2017, when it changed the district name to Eastpointe Community Schools to align with the community name. It has one high school (Eastpointe High School), one middle school (Eastpointe Middle School), and four elementary schools. The primary district boundaries of Eastpointe Community Schools encompass the City of Eastpointe and the southeastern portion of the city of Warren.

Government
Eastpointe is a Michigan home-rule city and operates under the council-manager form of government. The city's mayor and four council members are elected at large to four-year staggered terms. In 2019, Suzanne Pixley, who had been mayor since 2007, did not seek reelection after her third four-year term. Councilwoman Monique Owens succeeded Pixley as mayor in 2019.

In 2017, Eastpointe elected its first African-American councilwoman, Monique Owens. In November 2019, she became the first African-American mayor of Eastpointe, making the city the first in the county to elect an African-American as mayor.

Discrimination lawsuit
After a racial discrimination lawsuit was brought against the city regarding its election of all city council members through Plurality-at-large voting, alleging that the plurality-at-large system discriminated against African-American voters and violated Section 2 of the Voting Rights Act, the city settled the lawsuit with the United States Department of Justice in June 2019 by agreeing to switch to single transferable vote for the at-large election of city council members for the November 2019 municipal election. 

Beginning with the November 2019 election, ranked choice voting was used on the city council ballot, making Eastpointe the first municipality in Michigan to adopt ranked choice voting.

First Amendment lawsuit

In 2022, four Eastpointe residents filed a federal lawsuit against the City of Eastpointe and Mayor Monique Owens alleging violations of their First Amendment rights. The plaintiffs alleged that Owens had interrupted and censored their remarks during time allotted for public comments at council meetings and engaged in viewpoint discrimination against them. The complaint requested that the city amend its public comment rules and sought damages from the mayor.

On December 8, 2022, a federal judge issued a preliminary injunction prohibiting Owens from shouting down speakers or restricting the subject matter of their remarks. The order is to remain in effect until the case is resolved or the court orders otherwise.

The lawsuit stemmed largely from an incident at the council's September 6, 2022, meeting, during which Owens interrupted or talked over three residents who had attempted to speak. As Owens argued with one of the residents, the other four council members walked out, ending the meeting.

The plaintiffs are represented by attorneys from the  Foundation for Individual Rights and Expression (FIRE), a First Amendment advocacy group.

Entertainment and recreation
Cruisin' Gratiot in June is an annual weekend celebration of automotive history, tradition and memorabilia. The event includes car shows, contests, and live music.

The Michigan Military Technical & Historical Society Museum is in Eastpointe.

Eastpointe has many summer festivals and events, including Erin-Halfway Days Living History Festival held at John F. Kennedy Memorial Park in late July, Music in the Park Wednesday nights at Spindler Park, and Summer Fest, formerly known as The Ox Roast, mid to late August at John F. Kennedy Memorial Park.

Eastpointe is generally considered to be a bedroom community. It is a relatively short drive from many other points of interest in the Detroit area. It is served by Interstate 94 (I-94) and I-696, as well as M-3 (Gratiot Avenue), M-102 (8 Mile Road), and 9 Mile Road.

Geography
The city of Eastpointe borders Beechwood Avenue (up until it reaches Stephen Road, where it switches over to Hayes) on its western border, 8 Mile/M-102 on its southern border, Beaconsfield/the southern and western bound section of the I-94 service drive on its eastern border, and roughly 10 Mile Road on its northern border.

Demographics

2010 census
As of the census of 2010, there were 32,442 people, 12,557 households, and 8,220 families residing in the city. The racial makeup of the city was 65.6% White, 29.5% African American, 0.4% Native American, 1.1% Asian, 0.5% from other races, and 2.9% from two or more races. Hispanic or Latino of any race were 2.1% of the population.

There were 12,557 households, of which 34.9% had children under the age of 18 living with them, 39.9% were married couples living together, 19.5% had a female householder with no husband present, 6.0% had a male householder with no wife present, and 34.5% were non-families. 28.7% of all households were made up of individuals, and 10.7% had someone living alone who was 65 years of age or older. The average household size was 2.58 and the average family size was 3.19.

The median age in the city was 36.3 years. 25.7% of residents were under the age of 18; 8.8% were between the ages of 18 and 24; 28.6% were from 25 to 44; 25.7% were from 45 to 64; and 11.3% were 65 years of age or older. The gender makeup of the city was 48.4% male and 51.6% female.

2000 census
As of the census of 2000, there were 34,077 people, 13,595 households, and 8,959 families residing in the city. The racial makeup of the city was 92.13% White, 4.70% African-American, 0.42% Native American, 0.87% Asian, 0.01% Pacific Islander, 0.27% from other races, and 1.61% from two or more races. Hispanic or Latino of any race were 1.33% of the population.

There were 13,595 households, out of which 30.2% had children under the age of 18 living with them, 48.6% were married couples living together, 12.3% had a female householder with no husband present, and 34.1% were non-families. 28.8% of all households were made up of individuals, and 13.8% had someone living alone who was 65 years of age or older.  The average household size was 2.50 and the average family size was 3.11.

In the city, the population was spread out, with 24.5% under the age of 18, 7.6% from 18 to 24, 32.3% from 25 to 44, 19.2% from 45 to 64, and 16.5% who were 65 years of age or older.  The median age was 37 years. For every 100 females, there were 94.3 males.  For every 100 females age 18 and over, there were 90.9 males.

The median income for a household in the city was $46,261, and the median income for a family was $54,895. Males had a median income of $41,449 versus $28,095 for females. The per capita income for the city was $20,665.  About 4.2% of families and 6.4% of the population were below the poverty line, including 8.5% of those under age 18 and 7.8% of those age 65 or over.

Economy
The American Power Boat Association (APBA) is a New York non-profit, membership owned corporation that was created in 1903 by an act of the New York legislature as a racing association for powerboats. The APBA is headquartered in Eastpointe.

At one time Spirit Airlines had its headquarters in Eastpointe. The headquarters moved to Miramar, Florida in the Miami Metropolitan Area in November 1999.

In 1959, a young businessman by the name of Art Van Elslander opened the doors to a  Danish furniture showroom on Gratiot Avenue in Eastpointe which would become the first Art Van.

State and federal government facilities

The U.S. Postal Service operates the East Detroit Post Office in Eastpointe.

The Michigan Secretary of State has a branch office in Eastpointe.

People and events

Politics and business
David Wawrzynski of East Detroit (class of 88) started the food delivery service Wok To You (specializing in Chinese food) in the basement of his parents home on Lambrecht in 1991. Still operating in 2023.

Raised in Eastpointe, Douglas A. Brook (b. 1944) was United States Assistant Secretary of the Army (Financial Management and Comptroller) from 1990 to 1992 and Assistant Secretary of the Navy (Financial Management and Comptroller) from 2007 to 2009. 

Eric Bischoff (b. 1955)
former president of World Championship Wrestling (1993-99) and On-screen personality for WWE (2002-06). Currently the co-host of 83 Weeks podcast (2019-  )

Edward J. Bonior (1922–2001) was Mayor of East Detroit from 1963 to 1967. He is the head of the Boniors political family.

Merollis Chevrolet of Eastpointe is where Guinness Book of World Records "World's Greatest Salesman" Joe Girard set consecutive sales records over a fifteen-year period.

Former Eastpointe Mayor former Macomb County Commissioner and former representative of the Michigan House of Representatives Frank Accavitti Jr. is an Eastpointe resident. Accavitti is a former board member and past president of the Eastpointe Kiwanis Club. He also is a member of the Eastpointe Lions Club, the Selfridge Air National Guard Base Community Council, the Eastpointe Historical Society, the friends of the Roseville Library and the Eastpointe Community Chest. Accavitti has served as a trustee of the Eastpointe Employees' Pension Fund, the Eastpointe Memorial Library Board, the South Macomb Disposal Authority and the South East Macomb Sanitary District.

Jerry M. Linenger, M.D., M.S.S.M., M.P.H., Ph.D. (Captain, Medical Corps, USN, Ret.) is a former NASA astronaut, who flew on the Space Shuttle and Space Station Mir Born and raised in Eastpointe, Linenger graduated from East Detroit High School in 1973.

Arts and entertainment
Actor Jayson Blair of MTV's The Hard Times of RJ Berger is an Eastpointe native.

Rapper Kid Rock refers to Eastpointe in his song "It's Still East Detroit To Me."

Christian Berishaj (stage name JMSN) is an American singer, songwriter, multi-instrumentalist, producer, engineer, mixer, videographer and designer and a former member of the band, Love Arcade, in which he was known as Snowhite. He was raised in Eastpointe.

Mike Lubinski of the reality show Big Brother is from Eastpointe.

Jacob M. Appel's short story collection, Einstein's Beach House, is largely set in a fictionalized Eastpointe.

Adrenalin is an American rock band from East Detroit Michigan, that is perhaps best known for their song "Road of the Gypsy," featured in the 1986 film Iron Eagle.

Back in the USA is the 1970 debut studio album, and second album overall, by the American protopunk band MC5 recorded in Eastpointe in 1969.

Jeopardy! Tournament of Champions contestant Sandie Baker was from Eastpointe.

Athletics
East Detroit High School produced a number of professional football players, including Gary Ballman, Ron Kramer, Matt Hernandez, and Mickey Walker.

Dennis Brown is a former American football player and coach. In 1995, Brown was hired as the head football coach at East Detroit High School.

The Detroit Caesars were a professional softball team that played from 1977 through 1979 in the American Professional Slow Pitch Softball League (APSPL), winning two pro softball championships while playing at Memorial Field in East Detroit.  The team disbanded after the 1979 season, but the Detroit Auto Kings would play the 1980 season in the North American Softball League (NASL) at Memorial Field before ceasing play at the end of the season and ending professional softball played in East Detroit.

In popular culture
The "Recruiters" sketch from Mr. Show with Bob and David was set in East Detroit.

Education
Eastpointe Community Schools operates public schools in Eastpointe.  The southeastern corner of the city is served by South Lake Public Schools. Koepsell Elementary of the South Lake district is in Eastpointe.

Eaton Academy, a charter school, is in Eastpointe. It is located on the grounds of the former St. Veronica School of the Roman Catholic Archdiocese of Detroit.

St. Thomas Lutheran Church formerly operated the St. Thomas Lutheran School. A drop in enrollment occurred after the Great Recession in the late aughts. It closed in 2015. The Great Start Readiness Program began renting the facility after its closure.

Religion

Catholic churches
Roman Catholic churches in Eastpointe include St. Basil the Great Church and St. Veronica Parish.

The St. John Deaf Center, affiliated with Holy Innocents Church in Roseville, is in Eastpointe.

St. Barnabas Catholic Church closed permanently in 2021.

Our Lady of Grace Vietnamese Parish is in nearby Warren. Our Lady of Grace was previously in Eastpointe, but moved to Warren in 2012 when it merged with St. Cletus Church. Our Lady of Grace had an increasing parishioner base and was asking for a larger facility, so it was combined with another church with a declining number of parishioners.

See also

 List of cities in Michigan

References

Sources
 Eastpointe History, City website retrieved January 20, 2006
 Romig, Walter. Michigan Place Names. Detroit: Wayne State University Press, 1986.

External links

 

Cities in Macomb County, Michigan
Metro Detroit
Populated places established in 1897
Freedom of speech in the United States
2023 controversies in the United States
Political controversies in the United States
Political scandals in the United States